Cannabis in South Carolina is illegal for recreational use. Use of low-THC CBD oil is allowed for certain medical conditions.

Industrial Hemp
The cultivation of industrial hemp in South Carolina dates back to at least the 18th century. In 1733, an act was passed in the colony to encourage the growth of hemp for its "useful manufacture to his Majesty's Royal Navy". The cultivation of industrial hemp was greatly limited nationwide as a result of the federal 1937 Marihuana Tax Act.

In 2017, South Carolina re-legalized the growing of industrial hemp, under the auspices of the federal 2014 Farm Bill.

2014 legalization of CBD
In June 2014, Republican governor Nikki Haley signed into law Senate Bill 1035, "Julian's Law", following a unanimous Senate vote and a 92–5 House vote. The law allows children with severe epilepsy to be treated with CBD oil if recommended by a physician.

References